Marcel Appiah (born 26 March 1988) is a German professional footballer who plays as a centre-back or right-back for VfB Oldenburg. He previously played for Eredivisie club NEC, Arminia Bielefeld, VfL Osnabrück, Birmingham Legion, and VfR Aalen.

Early life
Appiah was born to a Ghanaian father and an Italian mother in Schwelm and grew up in Ennepetal.

Career
Appiah played in the youth for TuS Ennepetal, FC Schalke 04, TSG Sprockhövel, VfL Bochum and SG Wattenscheid. He made his professional debut in the 2. Bundesliga on 24 April 2010 against 1. FC Kaiserslautern.

Personal life
His uncle is the former Italian footballer and current German SPD politician Giuseppe Bianco.

Honours
NEC
Eerste Divisie: 2014–15

References

External links
 
 

1988 births
Living people
People from Schwelm
Sportspeople from Arnsberg (region)
German people of Italian descent
German sportspeople of Ghanaian descent
German footballers
Footballers from North Rhine-Westphalia
Association football defenders
TSG Sprockhövel players
Arminia Bielefeld players
NEC Nijmegen players
VfL Osnabrück players
Birmingham Legion FC players
VfR Aalen players
VfB Oldenburg players
2. Bundesliga players
3. Liga players
Regionalliga players
Eredivisie players
Eerste Divisie players
German expatriate footballers
German expatriate sportspeople in the Netherlands
Expatriate footballers in the Netherlands